Javier Fernández Cabrera Martín Peñato (born 4 October 1984) is a Spanish professional football coach. He currently manages the Bangladesh national football team. Cabrera is an UEFA Pro License Coach with wide experience in both professional and grassroots football projects. Cabrera also has a reputation as a football analyst. Cabrera has the experience of working as an expert analyst for Opta Sports and he also has a bachelor's degree in  football as well as advertising and marketing.

Coaching career
Cabrera worked as a technical director and as an assistant coach for Indian side Sporting Clube de Goa, from 2013 to 2015. In 2016, he was appointed as the manager for Spanish club CF Rayo Majadahonda and spent a year coaching the team, before leaving the club in 2017. Moreover, he was the head coach of FC Barcelona Academy in Northern Virginia for 4 months in 2018. From 2018, Cabrera acted as the Elite Academy coach of La Liga side Deportivo Alavés for 4 years.

Bangladesh national team
On 8 January 2022, Bangladesh Football Federation announced that they had hired Javier Fernández Cabrera as the new national team head coach. Cabrera signed an 11 month contract during a meeting called by the BFF on 19 January 2022, where he was officially made the head coach of the Bangladesh national football team. Upon signing the contract, Cabrera's first task was to observe the training sessions of all the Bangladesh Premier League teams, in order to scout for new talents. BFF also appointed Masud Parvez Kaiser as Cabrera's assistant coach and former national team goalkeeper Biplob Bhattacharjee as the country's goalkeeping coach. On 9 March, former Bangladesh national team captain Hassan Al-Mamun was also added to Cabrera's coaching panel, as an assistant coach.

Managerial statistics

References

External links

Living people
1984 births
Spanish expatriate football managers
Spanish football managers
Bangladesh national football team managers